Smugi may refer to the following places:
Smugi, Łódź Voivodeship (central Poland)
Smugi, Lublin Voivodeship (east Poland)
Smugi, Świętokrzyskie Voivodeship (south-central Poland)
Smugi, Greater Poland Voivodeship (west-central Poland)
Smugi, Drawsko County in West Pomeranian Voivodeship (north-west Poland)
Smugi, Koszalin County in West Pomeranian Voivodeship (north-west Poland)